Perrott is a surname. Notable people with the surname include:

Edward Perrott (1851–1915), English rugby union player
Herbert Perrott (politician) ( 1617–1683), English politician
Sir Herbert Perrott, 5th Baronet (1849–1922), English baronet
Nathan Perrott (born 1976), Canadian boxer and ice hockey player
Rebecca Perrott (born 1961), New Zealand swimmer
Thomas Perrott (1851–1919), British Army officer